This is a list of Honorary Fellows of The Queen's College, Oxford.

Tony Abbott
Rowan Atkinson
Sir James Ball
Sir Michael Barber
Sir Richard Barrons
Adrian Beecroft
Sir Tim Berners-Lee
Sir Christopher Bland
Sir Vernon Bogdanor
Cory Booker
Alan Bowman
Sir Alan Budd
Richard Carwardine
Clayton Christensen
Sir James Craig
Sir Brian Donnelly
David Eisenberg
Bill Frankland
Elizabeth Frood
Eric Garcetti
Sir John Gillen
Annette Gordon-Reed
Sir John Griffith Williams
Peter Hacker
Ilkka Hanski
Allen Hill
Leonard Hoffmann, Baron Hoffmann
Tony Honoré
Ioan James
David Jenkins
Ruth Kelly
Asma Khan
Ron Laskey
Sir Paul Lever
Colin Low, Baron Low of Dalston
Paul Madden
Avishai Margalit
Sir Colin McColl
Sir Fergus Millar
The Lord Morgan of Aberdyfi
Dennis Nineham
Caryl Phillips
Venki Ramakrishnan
Jim Reed
Oliver Sacks
Hayaatun Sillem
John Sloboda
Sir David Smith
Nicholas Stern, Baron Stern of Brentford
Claire Taylor
Sir Mark Turner
James Watt
Clair Wills

References

Honorary Fellows

Fellows of The Queen's College, Oxford
The Queen's College, Oxford
Queen's College